Eric McWoods (born October 21, 1995) is an American professional soccer player who plays as a forward for League of Ireland Premier Division club Finn Harps.

Early years
A St. Louis native, McWoods began playing soccer at the age of eight after his parents refused to let him play American football. He played at Kirkwood High School for four years, where he set school records for goals scored in a game (5), season (40) and career (87). His senior year, he was named an All-American and the NHSCAA Missouri State Offensive Player of Year. He also played basketball and ran track and field.

Club career

Narva Trans
McWoods signed for Narva Trans in January 2019. In his first season, he helped to win the Estonian Cup for the 2018–19 edition. He scored a hat-trick on July 21, 2019, against Tulevik in a 3–2 home win. His form in July continued and he ended up becoming the Player of the Month for July of the 2019 Meistriliiga season. In winning the Estonian Cup, McWoods and Narva qualified for the 2019–20 UEFA Europa League. They played in the first qualifying round and were drawn against Budućnost of Montenegro. Over the two-leg affair, Narva was beaten by an aggregate score of 6–1.

ZTE
In January 2020, McWoods moved to Hungarian side ZTE of the NB I.

Balzan FC
In the summer of 2020, McWoods moved to Balzan F.C. of the Maltese Premier League.

Finn Harps
After a short spell in Jordan with Al-Aqaba, McWoods moved to the League of Ireland Premier Division to join Finn Harps.

Honors
Narva Trans
Estonian Cup: 2018–19

References

External links
 
 Xavier Musketeers bio
 Kansas City Roos bio
 USL League Two profile

1995 births
Living people
Association football forwards
American soccer players
American expatriate soccer players
Xavier Musketeers men's soccer players
Kansas City Roos men's soccer players
JK Narva Trans players
Zalaegerszegi TE players
Balzan F.C. players
Shabab Al-Aqaba Club players
Finn Harps F.C. players
USL League Two players
Meistriliiga players
Nemzeti Bajnokság I players
Maltese Premier League players
Expatriate footballers in Estonia
Expatriate footballers in Hungary
Expatriate footballers in Malta
Expatriate association footballers in the Republic of Ireland
American expatriate sportspeople in Estonia
American expatriate sportspeople in Hungary
American expatriate sportspeople in Malta
American expatriate sportspeople in Ireland
African-American soccer players
Soccer players from St. Louis
American expatriate sportspeople in Jordan
Expatriate footballers in Jordan
Jordanian Pro League players
League of Ireland players
21st-century African-American sportspeople